Conospermum sigmoideum is a shrub endemic to Western Australia.

Description
It blooms between August and September producing blue flowers.

Distribution
It is found in the Goldfields-Esperance region of Western Australia where it grows in sandy soils.

References

External links

Eudicots of Western Australia
sigmoideum
Endemic flora of Western Australia
Plants described in 1995